Sarabhavaram is a village in Rajavommangi Mandal, Alluri Sitharama Raju district in the state of Andhra Pradesh in India.

Geography 

Demographics 
 India census, Sarabhavaram had a population of 615, out of which 273 were male and 342 were female. The population of children below 6 years of age was 6%. The literacy rate of the village was 55%.

References 

Villages in Rajavommangi mandal